Blue tetra is a common name for species of tetra including:

 Boehlkea fredcochui
 Knodus borki
 Mimagoniates microlepis
 Tyttocharax madeirae, species of fish

Tetras